NA-8 Bajaur is a constituency for the National Assembly of Pakistan consisting of the whole Bajaur District.

Members of Parliament

2002–2018: NA-44 Tribal Area-IX

2018-2022: NA-41 Tribal Area-II

Election 2002 

General elections were held on 10 Oct 2002. Haroon Rashid an Independent candidate won by 13,389 votes.

Election 2008 

The result of general election 2008 in this constituency is given below.

Result 
Akhunzada Chattan succeeded in the election 2008 and became the member of National Assembly.

Election 2013 

General elections were held on 11 May 2013. Shahab Ud Din Khan of PML-N won by 15,114 votes and became the  member of National Assembly.

Election 2018 

General elections were held on 25 July 2018.

See also
NA-7 Lower Dir-II
NA-9 Malakand

References

External links 
 Election result's official website

41
41